Jacob Quirin Fox (born July 20, 1982) is an American former professional baseball utility player. He played in Major League Baseball (MLB) for the Chicago Cubs, Oakland Athletics and Baltimore Orioles, and in the KBO League for the Hanwha Eagles.

Early years
Fox is a graduate of Cathedral High School and went on to attend the University of Michigan where he earned first-team all-Big Ten conference honors. In 2002, he played collegiate summer baseball in the Cape Cod Baseball League for the Yarmouth-Dennis Red Sox.

Professional career

Chicago Cubs
Fox was drafted as a catcher by the Chicago Cubs in the third round (73rd overall) of the 2003 Major League Baseball draft.

As a member of the Lugnuts, Fox was given the opportunity to catch for then-Cubs pitcher Mark Prior, who was on a rehab assignment. He was ecstatic to catch for Prior, and even invited his family members to attend the game. However, upon arriving at the club house, he found out that Paul Bako was actually slated to catch the game. Fox approached his manager, Julio Garcia, who claimed that Fox was not experienced enough to catch a Major League pitcher like Prior. Garcia then revealed that the team was playing a practical joke on Fox, and that he would actually be in the team's lineup.

On July 19, 2007, Fox was called up from Double-A Tennessee to the major leagues after shortstop César Izturis was traded to the Pittsburgh Pirates. Fox was called up with the intent that he would play first base, outfield, and be the third catcher. He made his major league debut on July 19, 2007, against the San Francisco Giants in a pinch hitting role and grounded into a double play. He had his first career hit on August 15 against Phil Dumatrait of the Cincinnati Reds, a double. Fox hit his first career home run on June 25, 2009 against Armando Galarraga of the Detroit Tigers. On August 29, 2009, Fox hit his first career grand slam against Bobby Parnell of the New York Mets.

In Triple-A with the Iowa Cubs in 2009, Fox had a breakout year. He was batting .423 and had hit 17 home runs and 50 RBIs by June 1, 2009, and was leading the PCL in both of these categories along with RBI, slugging percentage, and OPS. He was recalled to the Cubs on May 27, 2009. Fox was optioned back to Triple-A Iowa on June 10, 2009, and was recalled to the Chicago Cubs again on June 16. He achieved success as a part-time utility player, capable of filling in at corner outfield and infield positions, as well as catcher.

Oakland Athletics
On December 3, 2009, the Oakland Athletics acquired Fox along with Aaron Miles, from the Chicago Cubs for Jeff Gray, Matt Spencer and Ronny Morla.

Baltimore Orioles
On June 22, 2010, Fox was traded to the Baltimore Orioles for Ross Wolf and cash considerations. In Spring Training in 2011, he led the major leagues in home runs, with 10, and extra base hits, with 17. He was designated for assignment on June 1, and elected free agency on November 2.

Pittsburgh Pirates
The Pittsburgh Pirates signed Fox to a minor league contract in November 2011, and released him in June 2012.

Somerset Patriots
Fox signed with the Somerset Patriots in July 2012.

Philadelphia Phillies
On August 5, 2012, the Philadelphia Phillies signed Fox to a minor league contract.

Second stint with Patriots
On March 6, 2013, Fox signed with the Patriots for the 2013 season. He hit .310/.387/.572 with 25 home runs in 374 at bats.

Arizona Diamondbacks
On August 11, 2013, the Arizona Diamondbacks signed Fox to a minor league deal.

Vaqueros Laguna
Fox spent the 2013–14 Mexican Pacific League season with the Cañeros de Los Mochis, before signing with the Mexican League's Vaqueros Laguna on February 7, 2014.

Second stint with the Philadelphia Phillies
He was acquired by the Philadelphia Phillies on June 12.

Toronto Blue Jays
Fox signed a minor league contract with the Toronto Blue Jays on December 12, 2014, that included an invitation to spring training.

Hanwha Eagles
He played 29 games for the Double-A New Hampshire Fisher Cats before being released in order to sign a 1-year, $120,000 contract with the Hanwha Eagles of the Korea Baseball Organization.

Third stint with the Philadelphia Phillies
On January 8, 2016, the Philadelphia Phillies signed Fox to a minor league contract. He became a free agent on November 7, 2016. On July 29, 2017, Fox signed a minor league deal with the Philadelphia Phillies. He elected free agency on November 6, 2017.

Coaching career
Fox was named as the hitting coach of the Augusta GreenJackets for the 2019 season.

Post-baseball 
After a career in Minor and Major League Baseball, Fox entered the business world with his own brand The Fox Code, a lifestyle and clothing line inspired by the lessons he learned from the sport.

Awards

Florida State League Player of the Week (5/7/06)
Florida State League Mid-Season All-Star (2006)
Topps Florida State League Player of the Month (June 2006)
Baseball America High Class A All-Star (2006)
Southern League Player of the Week (5/21/07)
Southern League Mid-Season All-Star (2007)
Southern League Player of the Week (6/23/2008)
Southern League Post-Season All-Star (2008)
Pacific Coast League Player of the Week (4/20/2009)
Pacific Coast League Player of the Week (5/18/2009)
 Atlantic League Player of the Year (2013)
Baseball America's Independent League All-Star Team-1st Team (2013)

References

External links

1982 births
Living people
American expatriate baseball players in Mexico
American expatriate baseball players in South Korea
Arizona League Cubs players
Baltimore Orioles players
Baseball coaches from Indiana
Baseball players from Indiana
Cañeros de Los Mochis players
Chicago Cubs players
Daytona Cubs players
Estrellas Orientales players
Hanwha Eagles players
Indianapolis Indians players
Iowa Cubs players
Lansing Lugnuts players
Lehigh Valley IronPigs players
Major League Baseball catchers
Major League Baseball first basemen
Major League Baseball left fielders
Major League Baseball third basemen
Mesa Solar Sox players
Mexican League baseball first basemen
Mexican League baseball left fielders
Mexican League baseball third basemen
Michigan Wolverines baseball players
Norfolk Tides players
Oakland Athletics players
People from Beech Grove, Indiana
Reading Fightin Phils players
Reading Phillies players
Reno Aces players
Somerset Patriots players
Tennessee Smokies players
Tigres del Licey players
American expatriate baseball players in the Dominican Republic
Vaqueros Laguna players
West Tennessee Diamond Jaxx players
Yarmouth–Dennis Red Sox players